Baker–St. John House is a historic home located near Abingdon, Washington County, Virginia. It was built about 1866, and is a -story, frame dwelling with Italianate and Greek Revival stylistic elements. It sits on a limestone foundation and has a cross-gable roof. It features paired brackets along the cornice line of the house, decorative sawn brackets on the porch supports, and an extended bay window.

It was listed on the National Register of Historic Places in 2011.

References

Houses on the National Register of Historic Places in Virginia
Houses completed in 1866
Greek Revival houses in Virginia
Italianate architecture in Virginia
Houses in Washington County, Virginia
National Register of Historic Places in Washington County, Virginia
1866 establishments in Virginia